(JBGA) is a specified nonprofit corporation, to promote International Sports, mainly in support of the visually impaired and blind golfers, in addition to supporting social welfare programs for the visually impaired and people without visual impairments.

History
 In 1988, Haruhisa Handa made the acquaintance of an Australian, who was visually impaired, and living in Australia who was familiar with blind golf.  After returning to Japan, Handa introduced blind golf to Japan and recruited three Japanese visually impaired people to establish the Blind Golf Club in the same year. They started practicing blind golf at a golf training center in Tokyo in May 1988.  In July of that year, they first practiced on the golf course at Kosaido Country Club in Chiba Prefecture, Japan.  The Blind Golf Club delegated four blind and visually impaired golfers to play at the Blind Golf Australia World Open held in Perth, Australia.
 In September 1990, the Blind Golf Club delegated a member to the first Blind Golf World Championship as a guest player, who finished in the top 10.
 In October 1990, one of the players delegated to the 3rd Blind Golf Australia World Open won in the B1 Category.
 In April 1991, the Japan Blind Golf Association was established.  Five visually impaired new golfers joined from the Kansai area, and a new Blind Golf Association base was established in the Kansai area of Japan.
 In January 1992, a member golfer delegated from JBGA took part in Leader Dog Classic and won in the B1 Category.  It was the first time that a Japanese visually impaired player participated in a tournament hosted in USA.
 In January 1993, a golfer from JBGA won in the B1 Category at the Leader Dog Classic once again, and the second time in 2 consecutive years.
 In October 1993, a golfer from JBGA won in the B1 Category and another golfer  won in the Pro-Ama tournament at the Blind Golf Australia Championship.
 In August 1994, JBGA hosted the Blind Golf Japan Open Championship, the first official blind golf tournament held in Japan, at Sakuragaoka Country Club in Tama-City, Tokyo, and entered a member golfer of JBGA in the B1 Category.
 In June 1995, JBGA organized the Hanshin Awaji Earthquake disaster Support Blind Golf Charity Competition at Hanayashiki Golf Club in Hyogo, Japan with part of the proceeds being donated via the Asahi Broadcasting Corp. as a contribution to the disaster victims.
 In September 1995, JBGA held the Japan Open Commemorative Charity Competition at the same time as the Blind Golf Japan Open Championship; the proceeds were donated to the Gifu Visually Impaired Social Welfare Association.
 In July 1996, the Japanese name of JBGA was changed.
 In April 1997, the International Blind Golfers Conference, a former entity of International Blind Golf Association was held in Perth, Australia, where the JBGA took part as the representative of the blind golf organizations in Japan.
 In May 1999, an observation team of the visually impaired from France visited Japan. The JBGA introduced blind golf to them and offered them the rare opportunity to witness for the first time and also experience the sport first hand.
 In November 1999, the Board of International Blind Golf Association presented a letter of appreciation to the JBGA and to Handa, its honorary chairman, in recognition of their support and dedication since and prior to the establishment of the JBGA.
 In June 2000, the JBGA was registered as a specified nonprofit corporation by the Tokyo Metropolitan government.
 In 2004, the Japanese name of JBGA was changed and its headquarters was moved to Suginami-ku, Tokyo.

Organized Tournaments
 In July 1990, the JBGA hosted, under the name of the Blind Golf Club at that time, Japan’s first blind golf competition in cooperation with the Laforet Shuzenji Country Club in Izu, Shizuoka, Japan with 120 participants.
 In August 1994, the JBGA hosted the Blind Golf Japan Open Championship as the very first major International Blind Golf Tournament in Japan, where 21 blind golfers from 6 countries participated. Since then, tournaments have been organized consecutively, and the 10th event was held in 2013 under the name of the Foreign Minister’s Cup & Minister of Health, Labor and Welfare’s Cup.
 Since 2001, the JBGA started organizing the “Blind Golf Japan Tour” as a tour game held several times a year throughout Japan. Its title was then changed from “Tour” to “Championship”, and was further changed to the JBGA Championship and remained so since 2008.
 In 2006, the JBGA hosted The 2nd World Senior Golf Ladies Open in cooperation with International Blind Golf Association and Legends Tour (US Women’s Senior Golf Association).

Participating Tournament

(*) - Co-Sanctioned by Japan Blind Golf Association

(**) - Tour by Japan Blind Golf Association

Notable people
 Hauhisa Handa - Founder
 Nayoko Yoshikawa - Affiliation pro

TV

Tokyo Metropolitan Television
 A battle of blind golf and a visually impaired person (5/25/2002)
 Blind Golf Japan Open Championship (7/3/2004)
 A handicap is zero. 〜A Blind golfer meets a woman senior〜  (5/21/2005)
 Green of contact〜Blind golf connects the world.〜 (5/21/2006)
 WALK WITH〜Philanthropy of golf〜 （1/13/2008）

References

Sources

External links
 Japanese Blind Golf Association web site

International Sports Promotion Society
Parasports organizations
Golf associations
Blindness organizations in Japan
Golf in Japan
Blind sports
Disability organizations based in Japan
Parasports in Japan
Non-profit organizations based in Japan
Organizations based in Tokyo
Sports organizations established in 1988
1988 establishments in Japan